The Benetton B194 is a Formula One racing car designed by Rory Byrne for use by the Benetton team in the 1994 Formula One World Championship.

Design 
The car was closely based on its predecessors, the B192 and B193, and powered by a Ford Zetec-R V8 engine (produced by Cosworth but funded by and badged as a Ford), designed and developed by Geoff Goddard. It featured Mild Seven sponsorship for the first time, which was then carried on until the end of tobacco sponsorship in F1, replacing Camel as their main sponsor. The electronic driver aids that had such an effect on F1 over the previous seasons were banned, so the car had to be redesigned with the new rules in mind. The B194 was a light and nimble car that handled well and was most competitive in the hands of Schumacher on twisty tracks, unlike the early Williams FW16 which proved difficult to drive thanks to Williams's dependence on electronic driving aids in the previous season. Michael Schumacher's B194 remained the most competitive driver/car combination until Williams introduced a B-spec car at the German Grand Prix. The car also gained an anhedral lower rear wing element, similar to the one on the FW16, starting at the Canadian Grand Prix.

Launch control controversy 
Other teams suspected the B194 was not legal, due to the high competitiveness of such a comparatively underpowered car. The FIA launched an investigation and a start sequence (launch control) system was discovered in the cars' onboard computer systems but no traction control. In the end, the governing body could not prove the systems had been used so the complaints were dropped.

Racing history

Schumacher 
The car was very competitive in the hands of Michael Schumacher. Schumacher won six of the first seven races of the season after his main rival, Ayrton Senna, was killed at the San Marino Grand Prix. Schumacher himself was subject to controversy, after being disqualified from the British Grand Prix and then the Belgian Grand Prix which allowed Damon Hill to cut into the German's points lead and as they came to the final race in Australia, Hill, and Schumacher was separated by one point. A contentious collision between Hill and Schumacher ended the 1994 drivers' title in Schumacher's favour. 

Starting with the 1994 Pacific Grand Prix, Schumacher's car was adorned with small red accents, presumably to help spectators and television commentators distinguish his car from that of his teammates. During the preceding race, announcers from both ESPN and the BBC twice mistook the no. 6 Benetton as the no. 5 car. Schumacher commented years later that the B194 was actually quite a handful to drive, being twitchy at the rear end.

Teammates 

Schumacher had three team-mates—JJ Lehto, Jos Verstappen, and Johnny Herbert—during the course of the season.  All found the B194 difficult to drive; Verstappen said in 1996 that "I must have a little the same driving style as Johnny because he said basically the same things about that car that I did and seems to have had the same feelings. It was a very difficult car. You could not feel the limit and so you were pushing and pushing and then suddenly it would have oversteer. Normally when you get oversteer you can control it but the Benetton would go very suddenly and so you ended up having a spin. I had big problems with that car."

The B194 was retired at the end of the season with eight wins and second place in the Constructors' Championship. The car was replaced by the B195 for 1995.

In popular culture
The Benetton B194 is featured in the F1 2020 video game as a DLC for the "Deluxe Schumacher Edition".

Complete Formula One results
(key) (results in bold indicate pole position; results in italics indicate fastest lap)

References

External links

1994 Formula One season cars
B194
Formula One championship-winning cars
Formula One controversies